Gundula Diel (born 13 May 1941) is a German hurdler. She competed in the women's 80 metres hurdles at the 1964 Summer Olympics.

References

External links
 

1941 births
Living people
Athletes (track and field) at the 1964 Summer Olympics
German female hurdlers
Olympic athletes of the United Team of Germany
Sportspeople from Potsdam